Paranga may refer to:
Paranga, Russia, an urban-type settlement in the Mari El Republic, Russia
Paranga, Tanzania, an administrative ward in Tanzania
Paranga, Uganda, a town in Gulu District, Uganda
Paranga, Mykonos, a beach in Mykonos island, Greece.
Paranga (football), a Greek folk expression for the football corruption